The 1963 Ivy League football season was the eighth season of college football play for the Ivy League and was part of the 1963 NCAA University Division football season. The season began on September 28, 1963, and ended on November 30, 1963. Ivy League teams were 13–1–1 against non-conference opponents and Dartmouth and Princeton won the conference co-championship.

Season overview

Schedule

Week 1

Week 2

Week 3

Week 4

Week 5

Week 6

Week 7

Week 8

Week 9

1964 NFL Draft

Two Ivy League players were drafted in the 1964 NFL draft, held in December 1963: Gary Wood and Dick Niglio.

References